HWL Ebsworth is a commercial law firm that operates throughout Australia. It is the largest partnership among Australian law firms, with 269 partners as of 2020.

HWL Ebsworth operates offices in Adelaide, Brisbane, Canberra, Darwin, Hobart, Melbourne, Norwest, Perth and Sydney. It trades in the areas of Banking & Financial Services, Building & Construction, Corporate & Commercial, Insurance, Litigation & Dispute Resolution, Planning & Environment, Government, Real Estate & Projects, Transport and Workplace Relations & Safety.

History 

HWL Ebsworth traces its foundation back to the 1890s. Throughout the second half of the 20th century, the firm was known as Ebsworth and Ebsworth prior to merging with Home Wilkinson Lowry in 2008.

In 2011 HWL Ebsworth opened its new office in Canberra, one of the largest law offices located in the Australian Capital Territory. In 2013 the firm expanded into Western Australia by merging with Downings Legal. In 2014 HWL Ebsworth merged with Adelaide commercial law firm Kelly & Co and established an office in Adelaide.

In December 2014, HWL Ebsworth announced that it had acquired two additional Australian law firms based in the Northern Territory and South Australia.

In August 2016, HWL Ebsworth opened a Tasmanian office, making it the only commercial law firm to have offices in every State and Territory of Australia.

In February 2018, HWL Ebsworth acquired mid-tier firm TressCox Lawyers, founded in 1897, bringing the partner count to approximately 230 plus another 900 legal and support staff.

Practice areas 

HWL Ebsworth is a full-service commercial law firm and the firm accordingly participates in all major commercial law practice areas. A substantial amount of the firm's work includes:
 Insurance, 
 Banking and Financial Services, 
 Construction, 
 Capital Markets, 
 Corporate and Commercial, 
 Energy and Resources, 
 Government, 
 Insolvency, 
 Intellectual Property, 
 Litigation and Dispute Resolution and 
 Transport.

As of 2020, HWL Ebsworth was ranked by Chambers and Partners as a "band 1" Australian firm in aviation, native title and shipping, and by The Legal 500 as a "tier 1" Australian firm in aviation.

Offices 

  Melbourne (447 Collins Street - Head Office)
  Sydney (Australia Square)
  Norwest (Norwest Business Park)
  Darwin (Mitchell Centre)
  Canberra (HWL Ebsworth Building)
  Brisbane (480 Queen Street)
  Perth (240 St George's Terrace)
  Adelaide (Westpac House)
  Hobart (85 Macquarie Street)

Notable employees

 Sandy Street, a judge of the Federal Circuit Court of Australia, worked as a lawyer at the firm before being called to the Bar.
 Ron McCallum AO, a legal academic and former dean of law at the University of Sydney, became a consultant at HWL Ebsworth in 2010.
 Alan Rose AO, a former public servant, became a consultant at HWL Ebsworth in 2012.

References

Law firms of Australia